The NP postcode area, also known as the Newport postcode area, is a group of eighteen postcode districts, which are subdivisions of fourteen post towns. These cover south-east Wales, including Newport, Pontypool, Abergavenny, Monmouth, Chepstow, Abertillery, Usk, Tredegar, New Tredegar, Ebbw Vale, Crickhowell, Blackwood, Caldicot and Cwmbran, plus a small part of the English counties of Gloucestershire and Herefordshire.



Coverage
The approximate coverage of the postcode districts:

|-
! NP4
| PONTYPOOL
| Pontypool, Blaenavon, Little Mill, Griffithstown, parts of Glascoed
| Torfaen, Monmouthshire
|-
! NP7
| ABERGAVENNY
| Abergavenny
| Monmouthshire, Herefordshire, Powys
|-
! NP8
| CRICKHOWELL
| Crickhowell , Ffawyddog
| Powys
|-
! NP10
| NEWPORT
| Western Newport, including Bassaleg, Duffryn, Rogerstone
| Newport
|-
! NP11
| NEWPORT
| North-western Newport, including: Abercarn, Crumlin, Cwmfelinfach, Risca, Ynysddu
| Caerphilly
|-
! NP12
| BLACKWOOD
| Blackwood, Pontllanfraith, Wyllie
| Caerphilly
|-
! NP13
| ABERTILLERY
| Abertillery
| Blaenau Gwent
|-
! NP15
| USK
| Usk, Raglan
| Monmouthshire
|-
! NP16
| CHEPSTOW
| Chepstow, Sedbury, Beachley
| Monmouthshire, Forest of Dean
|-
! NP18
| NEWPORT
| Eastern Newport, including Caerleon, Langstone, Llanwern, Nash, Llandegveth Underwood
| Newport, Monmouthshire, Torfaen
|-
! NP19
| NEWPORT
| Eastern and East Central Newport, including: Beechwood, Maindee, St. Julians, Ringland
| Newport
|-
! NP20
| NEWPORT
| Western and West Central Newport, including:  City centre, Pill, Maesglas, Crindau, Malpas, Bettws
| Newport
|-
! NP22
| TREDEGAR
| Tredegar, Rhymney
| Blaenau Gwent, Caerphilly
|-
! NP23
| EBBW VALE
| Ebbw Vale, Brynmawr, Cwm
| Blaenau Gwent
|-
! NP24
| NEW TREDEGAR
| New Tredegar
| Caerphilly
|-
! NP25
| MONMOUTH
| Monmouth, Wyesham, Redbrook, Welsh Newton
| Monmouthshire, Forest of Dean, Herefordshire
|-
! NP26
| CALDICOT
| Caldicot, Magor, Newport
| Monmouthshire, Newport
|-
! NP44
| CWMBRAN
| Cwmbran
| Torfaen
|}

Map

See also
Postcode Address File
List of postcode areas in the United Kingdom

References

External links
Royal Mail's Postcode Address File
A quick introduction to Royal Mail's Postcode Address File (PAF)
Using Welsh alternative addresses within Royal Mail's Postcode Address File (PAF)

Newport, Wales
Postcode areas covering South West England
Postcode areas covering Wales
Postcode areas covering the West Midlands (region)